James Alfred Roosevelt Estate, also known as Yellowbanks, is a historic estate located at Cove Neck in Nassau County, New York.  It is located several hundred feet west of Sagamore Hill, home of President Theodore Roosevelt.  It was designed by architect Bruce Price (1845-1903) in 1881 as a summer home for James A. Roosevelt (1825-1898), uncle to Theodore Roosevelt.  It is a Shingle Style house, basically rectangular in massing, two and a half to three stories in height with a gambrel roof.  The home was occupied by Emlen Roosevelt (1857-1930).

It was listed on the National Register of Historic Places in 1979.

References

1881 establishments in New York (state)
Bruce Price buildings
Houses completed in 1881
Houses in Nassau County, New York
Houses on the National Register of Historic Places in New York (state)
National Register of Historic Places in Nassau County, New York
James Alfred
Shingle Style architecture in New York (state)